PT Digital Semantika Indonesia, doing business as Digital Happiness, is a software design company and video game developer based in Indonesia. The founder of the company and main producer of their most well-known game, DreadOut, is Rachmad Imron.

Games 
List of games made by this developer:

 The Hallway Raid (2012)
 DreadOut (2014)
 DreadOut: Keepers of the Dark (2016)
  DreadEye (2017)
 DreadOut 2 (2020)

References

External links
  
 Official site for DreadOut 

Companies based in Bandung
Video game publishers
Video game development companies
Video game companies of Indonesia
Indonesian companies established in 2013
Video game companies established in 2013